Ingenious (originally titled Lightbulb) is a 2009 American film.  It is a rags-to-riches story of two friends, a small-time inventor and a sharky salesman, who hit rock bottom before coming up with a gizmo that becomes a worldwide phenomenon. It is based on the true story of some friends who are trying to come up with an invention, before hitting on an idea.

Cast
Dallas Roberts as Matt, an inventor
Jeremy Renner as Sam, Matt's lifelong friend and business partner
Ayelet Zurer as Gina, Matt's wife
Marguerite Moreau as Cinda 
 as Louisa
Richard Kind as Newkin
Eddie Jemison as Bean
Judith Scott as Rita
Debby Rosenthal as Brenda
Michael Kagan as Mort
Rob Brownstein as Kent
Vince Grant as Randall
François Chau as Mr. Chow

Production
The film was shot on location in Tucson, Arizona and Hong Kong. It premiered at the 2009 Santa Barbara International Film Festival.

See also
List of films shot in Arizona

References

External links
 
 

2009 films
2000s buddy films
American buddy drama films
American comedy-drama films
2009 comedy-drama films
2000s English-language films
2000s American films